Yeralwadi Dam, is an earthfill dam on Yerala river near Khatav, Satara district in the state of Maharashtra in India.

Specifications

Purpose
 Irrigation 
 The region of yeralwadi Dam is a birding hotspot in Satara district. Greater flamingoes, winter migratory ducks, waders have a great diversity in this region.

See also
 Dams in Maharashtra
 List of reservoirs and dams in India

References

Dams in Satara district
Dams completed in 1973
1973 establishments in Maharashtra